Giovanni "Gianni" Perricelli (born August 25, 1967 in Milan) is an Italian race walker who competed at four editions of Olympic Games: 1988 Summer Olympics, 1992 Summer Olympics, 1996 Summer Olympics, 2000 Summer Olympics,

Achievements

See also
 Italian all-time lists - 50 km walk

References

External links

 

1967 births
Living people
Italian male racewalkers
Athletes (track and field) at the 1988 Summer Olympics
Athletes (track and field) at the 1992 Summer Olympics
Athletes (track and field) at the 1996 Summer Olympics
Athletes (track and field) at the 2000 Summer Olympics
Olympic athletes of Italy
World Athletics Championships medalists
European Athletics Championships medalists
Universiade medalists in athletics (track and field)
World Athletics Championships athletes for Italy
Universiade silver medalists for Italy
Medalists at the 1995 Summer Universiade
20th-century Italian people